11-Dehydroprogesterone, also known as pregna-4,11-diene-3,20-dione, is a steroidal progestin that was never marketed. It was found to be 2- to 3-fold as potent as progesterone as a progestogen in animal bioassays, although other studies found them to be equivalent in potency. 11-Dehydroprogesterone has been studied in women. It was discovered in the 1930s or 1940s and was one of the earliest synthetic progestogens.

See also
 17α-Methylprogesterone
 19-Norprogesterone

References

Diketones
Pregnanes
Progestogens